The 2009 All Star Children's Foundation Sarasota Open was a professional tennis tournament played on outdoor green clay courts. It was part of the 2009 ATP Challenger Tour. It took place in Longboat Key, Florida, United States between May 9 and May 17, 2009.

Singles entrants

Seeds

 Rankings are as of May 11, 2009.

Other entrants
The following players received wildcards into the singles main draw:
  Stephen Bass
  Ryan Harrison
  Chris Klingemann
  Jesse Witten

The following players received entry from the qualifying draw:
  Ričardas Berankis
  Bernard Tomic
  James Ward
  Fritz Wolmarans

The following players received the lucky loser spots:
  Nicolás Todero

The following players received special exempt into the main draw:
  Alex Kuznetsov

Champions

Singles

 James Ward def.  Carsten Ball, 7–6(4), 4–6, 6–3

Doubles

 Víctor Estrella /  Santiago González def.  Harsh Mankad /  Kaes Van't Hof, 6–2, 6–4

External links
Official website
ITF search 

All Star Children's Foundation Sarasota Open
Sarasota Open
All Star Children's Foundation
2009 in American tennis